is the tallest mountain in the Kitami Mountains. It is located on the border of Shibetsu and Takinoue, Hokkaidō, Japan. It is the source of the Teshio River.

History

Geology
Mount Teshio is composed of felsic non-alkali rock from 15 to 7 million years old.

Flora and fauna
At the base of the mountain there are abundant black woodpeckers as well as Japanese red foxes and Hokkaidō brown bears. Near the summit, pika can be found.

Prominent alpine plants on the mountain are Rhododendron aureum and Diapensia lapponica.

Climbing routes
There are three climbing routes up the mountain:
  starts on the Mount Mae Teshio trail and branches off. This trail is only for experienced climbers.
There is a connecting path between the new trail and the other two trails.

External links
 Mount Teshio Prefectural Natural Park Trail Map, Official Hokkaido website.

References

 Geographical Survey Institute

Mountains of Hokkaido